The Russian-language surname Chizhevsky (feminine: Chizhevskaya) derives from the word "chizh" meaning "siskin". Surnames of similar derivations include Chizh,  Chizhov. Polish-language equivalent: Czyżewski.

The surname may refer to:

 Alexander Chizhevsky was a Soviet-era interdisciplinary scientist, a biophysicist who founded "heliobiology".
 Ilya Chizhevsky, Russian businessman
 Kim Chizevsky-Nicholls - American professional bodybuilder
 Chizhevski BOK-1
 Chizhevski BOK-5

Russian-language surnames